Criminal Sanctions Agency (abbreviated to Rise) is a Finnish government agency that enforces prison sentences, community service sentences and maintains rehabilitation services. Rise operates under the direction of the Ministry of Justice.

Rise maintains 26 prisons and 14 community service offices in Finland.

See also

Human rights in Finland
Law enforcement in Finland
Judicial system of Finland

References

Government agencies of Finland